Nicolò Casale (born 14 February 1998) is an Italian footballer who plays as a defender for Serie A club Lazio.

Club career
Casale made his Serie B debut for Perugia on 16 September 2017 in a game against Parma.

On 18 July 2019, Casale joined Venezia on loan with an option to buy.

On 3 October 2020, Casale went to Empoli on loan.

On 8 July 2022, Lazio announced the signing of Casale on a permanent deal.

International career
He made his debut with the Italy U21 on 3 September 2020, in a friendly match won 2–1 against Slovenia.

Career statistics

References

External links
 

1998 births
Sportspeople from the Province of Verona
Footballers from Veneto
Living people
Italian footballers
Association football defenders
Italy youth international footballers
Hellas Verona F.C. players
A.C. Perugia Calcio players
A.C. Prato players
F.C. Südtirol players
Venezia F.C. players
Empoli F.C. players
S.S. Lazio players
Serie A players
Serie B players
Serie C players